

Storms
Note:  indicates the name was retired after that usage in the respective basin

 Ma-on
 2004 –  became a super typhoon and made landfall on the Izu Peninsula, Honshū, Japan, killing 6 people.
 2011 – a large and powerful typhoon that affected southern Japan in July 2011.
 2016 – did not make landfall.
 2022 – affected northern Luzon, Philippines, South China and northern Vietnam.

 Madeline
 1949 – did not make landfall. 
 1961 – downgraded in post-analysis, should not have been named.
 1968 – never threatened land.
 1976 – Made landfall near Zihuatanejo, causing heavy damage.
 1980 – short-lived storm, stayed out to sea.
 1986 – not a threat to land.
 1992 – stayed out to sea.
 1998 – threatened Islas Marías and parts of Mexico before dissipating caused no damage.
 2016 – Category 4 major hurricane that approached Hawaii but veered southward and missed the islands.
 2022 – caused some damage as it moved along the coast of southwestern Mexico.

 Maggie
 1946 – never threatened land.
 1966 – a weak tropical storm that paralleled the Mexican coast where it eventually made landfall in the Manzanillo.
 1970 – a tropical storm that approached Hawaii and brought heavy rains.
 1971 – a category 3 tropical cyclone (australian scale), stayed sea.
 1974 – a Category 4 hurricane, never threatened land. 
 1999 – a large and powerful typhoon that affected the Philippines and southeast Asia.

 Malakas
 2005 - a weak tropical storm which drifted out to sea.
 2010  - a strong Category 2 typhoon which stayed out to sea.
 2016  - a powerful Category 4 typhoon which impacted Taiwan and Japan, killing 1 person.
 2022 - an extremely large early-season Category 4 typhoon which remained out to sea.

 Maliksi
 2012 – storm's center passed over Iwo To (Iwo Jima).
 2018 – remained at sea, but  brought rainfall to the Philippines and to Japan.

 Malou
 2004 – struck Japan.
 2010 – struck Japan and brought heavy rain.
 2016 - a storm that was not recognized by the JTWC.
 2021 – a strong typhoon that remained out to sea.

 Mamie
 1953 – a powerful category 3 typhoon that passed off the coast of Japan.
 1957 – a powerful category 3 typhoon, stayed sea.
 1960 – a powerful category 4 typhoon then passed to the southeast of Tokyo no damage was reported.
 1963 – a powerful category 3 typhoon, stayed sea.
 1968 – a category 1 typhoon that affected the Philippines and South Vietnam.
 1972 – a weak tropical storm made landfall in Vietnam. 
 1975 – a brief tropical storm that passed near South Japan and broke up near South Korea.
 1982 – a strong tropical storm made landfall in Nha Trang.
 1985 – the worst tropical cyclone to affect northeastern China in 26 years.
 1988 – a weak tropical storm, did not make landfall.

 Mandous (2022) – a strong tropical cyclone struck the Andaman and Nicobar Islands, as well as South India.
 Mangga (2020) – a weak Category 1 tropical cyclone  (Australian scale) that hit western Australia with damaging winds and heavy rain.
 Man-yi
 2001 – a strong typhoon that remained out to sea.
 2007 – a powerful tropical cyclone that battered Japan as a weakening typhoon and became the second super typhoon of the 2007, just after Yutu. 
 2013 – a very severe storm that brought very strong winds and flash floods to Japan during mid-September.
 2018 – November typhoon that stayed out to sea.

 Mangkhut
 2013 – a weak storm that landfall in Northern Vietnam.
 2018 – a destructive Category 5 super typhoon that made landfall in Cagayan, Philippines, and subsequently impacted Hong Kong and southern China.

 Manuel
 1983 – never made landfall.
 1989 – paralleled the coast of Mexico; never made landfall.
 2001 – formed from the remnants of Hurricane Iris.
 2013 – costliest Pacific hurricane on record; made landfall twice in Mexico (Colima, Sinaloa); killed at least 169 people.

 Marce
 2004 – a mid-season category two typhoon that brought severe damage to Taiwan and the People's Republic of China in August 2004.
 2008  – a typhoon which affected the Philippines, Taiwan, China and Japan.
 2012 – a powerful tropical storm made landfall over southern Tuy Hòa, Vietnam.
 2016 – a powerful tropical storm hit Philippines.
 2020 – a powerful tropical storm that passed along the coast of Japan

 Marcia
 1974 – did not affect land.
 1989 – did not affect land.
 2000 – did not affect land.
 2015 – one of the most intense tropical cyclones making landfall over Queensland, Australia.

 Marcus (2018) – A severe tropical cyclone that struck Australia's Northern Territory and the Kimberley region of Western Australia in 2018. It was the most destructive storm to hit Darwin since Cyclone Tracy in 1974.

 Marco
 1990 – hugged west coast of Florida, making landfall as a tropical depression, causing heavy rain and moderate damage.
 1996 – formed in the Caribbean Sea and, while never making landfall, was large enough to drop heavy rain on Central America and Hispaniola, causing flooding and mudslides that killed eight
 2008 – smallest tropical cyclone (radius of winds from center) on record that rapidly formed in the Bay of Campeche.
 2020 – a minimal Category 1 hurricane that formed in the central Caribbean and subsequently weakened to a tropical depression before degenerating into a remnant low in the northern Gulf of Mexico.

 Marge
 1945 – a weak tropical stormmaking landfall on Philippines. 
 1951 – an unusually intense and large typhoon that formed in August 1951 during the 1951.
 1955 – a category 3 typhoon, hit Japan.
 1962 – never made landfall.
 1964 – a powerful tropical cyclone that impacted Palau and the Philippines in November 1964.
 1967 – a powerful category 4 typhoon hit Philippines.
 1970 – strong tropical storm made landfall Philippines.
 1973 – a typhoon that formed in September 1973.
 1976 – a strong tropical storm did not make landfall.
 1980 – stayed at sea.
 1983 – a powerful category 5 typhoon, stayed at sea.
 1986 – a category 2 typhoon, hit Philippines.

 Margot (1985) – a category 3 tropical cyclone impact Western Australia.

 Maria
 2000 – a severe tropical storm that made a landfall in southern China.
 2005 – a Category 3 hurricane that did not affect any land area as a tropical cyclone.
 2006 – tracked just south and east of Japan.
 2011 – a Category 1 hurricane that formed in the eastern Atlantic, made landfall on Newfoundland, causing minor damage.
 2012 – did not affect land.
 2017 – an extremely powerful hurricane that made landfall in the island of Dominica at Category 5 intensity, and later brushed through St. Croix, U.S. Virgin Islands before making landfall in Puerto Rico as a high-end Category 4 hurricane where devastation and a humanitarian crisis occurred.
 2018 – a Category 5 super typhoon which weakened before making landfall in East China.

 Marie
 1954 – a relatively weak typhoon which nonetheless devastated Japan and killed 1,361 people.
 1958 – a strong typhoon that had no effects on land.
 1961 – made landfall in Shikoku as a tropical depression.
 1964 – an erratic system which meandered in the Ryukyu Islands.
 1966 – another strong typhoon that stayed at sea.
 1969 – the final storm of the 1969 season; did not affect land areas.
 1972 – destroyed many crops and coconut palms in the Northern Marianas Islands
 1976 – a strong early-season typhoon which did not affect land.
 1984 – a Category 1 hurricane that stayed offshore Baja California in early September.
 1990 – a Category 4 hurricane that had no effects on land; briefly threatened the Hawaiian islands.
 1997 – a typhoon which formed in the Northern Mariana Islands but ultimately did not impact any major landmass.
 2008 – a Category 1 hurricane that had no effects on land.
 2014 – a rare Category 5 hurricane that produced some flooding in coastal Mexico while producing large swells that caused damage and multiple deaths along Baja California and Southern California.
 2020 – a Category 4 hurricane that had no effects on land.

 Marilyn
1995 – Category 3 hurricane that caused significant damage in the Leeward Islands.
 2015 – a strong typhoon, but stayed out in sea.
 2019 – a weak system that drifted over the open sea before dissipating.

 Maring
 1964 –  a tropical depression that was only recognized by JTWC and PAGASA.
 1968 – made landfall on Miyakojima and Kyūshū in Japan.
 1972 – traversed the southern Ryukyu Islands, passed just north of Taiwan and struck China.
 1976 – struck Japan.
 1980 – weak tropical depression which affected the Philippines and China.
 1984 – struck the northern part of Luzon claiming 121 lives, before making landfall in China.
 1988 – made landfall on the extreme northern tip of Luzon Island and then Hong Kong.
 1992 – brushed Luzon, then hit southern Taiwan, eastern China, and South Korea, causing 61 deaths.
 1996 – a strong typhoon which brushed the northern portion of the Philippines and eventually made landfall in southern China, causing at least 140 fatalities.
 2000 – struck Vietnam.
 2001 –  hit Taiwan and the Ryukyu Islands.
 2005 – triggered mudslides killing 95 in eastern China.
 2009 – hit Hainan and northern Vietnam.
 2013 – caused flooding in the Philippines.
 2017 – impacted the Philippines and Vietnam.
 2021 – a deadly and damaging storm which affected the Philippines, China and Hong Kong.

 Mario
 2014 - brushed the Northern Philippines, where it caused over $231 million in damages; later landfall on Shanghai, China.
 2019 – never threatened land.

 Martin
 1986 – weak tropical cyclone had only minor effects on land.
 1997 – damaging and deadly Category 3 tropical cyclone that affected the Cook Islands and French Polynesia.
 1999 – caused devastating damage in southern France in late December 1999, killing 30 people.
 2022 – large but short-lived category 1 hurricane that churned in the open North Atlantic.

 Martha
 1948 – remained out at sea.
 1966 – did not make landfall.
 1969 – was the only known tropical cyclone to make landfall in Panama.

 Marty
 1985 – no effect on land.
 1991 – briefly threatened the Mexican coastline.
 1996 – a minimal storm that killed 125 in Vietnam.
 1997 – not a threat to land.
 2003 – made two landfalls on the Baja California peninsula.
 2009 – never affected land.
 2015 – affected southwestern Mexico.
 2021 – had no effect on land; formed from the remnants of Atlantic basin Hurricane Grace.

 Matmo
 2008 – no effect on land.
 2014 – the first tropical cyclone to impact Taiwan in 2014.
 2019 – a strong tropical storm made landfall in Vietnam.

 Matthew
 2004 - Brought heavy rain to the Gulf Coast of Louisiana, causing light damage but no deaths.
 2010 - Made landfall in Central America and later moved into Mexico, causing 171 million in damages and 126 deaths.
 2016 - an intense Category 5 hurricane that caused $16.4 billion in damages and at least 603 deaths throughout the Caribbean and the United States.

 Mawar
 2005 – a strong super typhoon that battered southern Japan and caused great damage across the country.
 2012 – a strong typhoon did not make landfall.
 2017 – a strong tropical storm affected China.

 Max
 1981 (March) – Category 3 tropical cyclone, crossed the Top End of Australia's Northern Territory, then moved west out to sea.
 1981 (October) – did not make landfall.
 1987 –  Category 4 hurricane, churned in the open ocean.
 1993 – did not make landfall.
 2005 – Category 1 hurricane, no threat to land.
 2017 – Category 1 hurricane, made landfall in southwestern Mexico.

 Maymay
 2018 – a strong Category 5 typhoon that made landfall in Japan, becoming its costliest typhoon in terms of uninsured losses.
 2022 – a short-lived depression that stayed off the coast of the Philippines.

 Maysak
 2002– did not make landfall.
 2008 – a strong tropical storm affected Philippines and Vietnam.
 2015 – an unusually intense typhoon during the early part of 2015.
 2020 - a powerful category 4 typhoon that passed through the Ryukyu Islands and caused heavy damage on the Korean Peninsula.

 Meari
 2004 – a typhoon that hit Japan in September 2004. Meari killed 27 people and caused nearly $800 million in damages
 2011 – an unusually large tropical cyclone that caused significant damage from the Philippines to the Korean Peninsula in June 2011.
 2016 – churned in the open ocean.
 2022 – the brushed the southern coast of Japan without causing major impacts.

 Megh (2015) – is regarded as the worst tropical cyclone to ever strike the Yemeni island of Socotra, causing additional destruction there after Cyclone Chapala hit the same island.

 Megi
 2004 – moved through the Ryūkyū islands before passing between South Korea and Japan.
 2010 – an intense typhoon that struck Luzon, causing damages amounting to $709 million, Taiwan and Fujian, China.
 2016 – a large and powerful tropical cyclone which affected Taiwan and eastern China in late September 2016.
 2022 – a deadly tropical cyclone that stalled in Leyte Gulf, bringing widespread flooding to the Philippines.

 Mekkhala
 2002 – a weak tropical storm affected China.
 2008 – affected southern China.
 2015 – the first tropical storm of the 2015 season.
 2020 – impacted southern China as a severe tropical storm.

 Melissa
 1994 – remained over open waters.
 2007 – short-lived storm west of Cape Verde, never threatened land.
 2013 – short-lived storm in the central Atlantic, never threatened land.
 2019 – short-lived storm that formed in the central Atlantic.

 Melor
 2003 – a Category 1 typhoon that affected the Philippines, Taiwan and Japan.
 2009 – a category 5 typhoon that struck Japan.
 2015 – a category 4 typhoon that struck the Philippines.

 Meranti
 2004 – a typhoon which stayed at sea throughout its lifetime, and also the first of a record nine named storms to form during the 2004 season.
 2010 – a short-lived tropical storm which was upgraded by JMA to a severe tropical storm in post-analysis; peaked as a Category 1-equivalent tropical cyclone before making landfall in Fujian, China.
 2016 - a strong typhoon that struck Taiwan and China, causing at least $4.7 billion worth of damage.

 Merbok
 2004 – brought heavy flooding during mid-November 2004.
 2011 – remained out at sea.
 2017 – made landfall in China. 
 2022 – remained out at sea.

 Michael
 2000 – Category 2 hurricane that caused moderate damage in Canada.
 2012 – Category 3 hurricane that did not affect land.
 2018 – Category 5 hurricane that formed near Central America, causing heavy flooding as it lingered over the area as a tropical depression, then rapidly intensified over the Gulf of Mexico making landfall in Florida at peak intensity. Michael caused about 74 fatalities and caused an estimated $25.1 billion (2018 USD) in damages.

 Michelle
 1970 – a strong tropical cyclone, never threatened land.
 2001 – a powerful category 4 hurricane, fifth costliest tropical cyclone in Cuban history and strongest of the 2001.

 Mick
 1993 – Weak tropical cyclone that passed through Fiji, Tonga and New Zealand. 
 2009 – Made landfall on Fiji and killed at least eight.

 Mike
 1950 – did not make landfall.
 1990 – the strongest typhoon to hit the Philippines since Typhoon Irma in 1981 and Typhoon Nina in 1987.
 2014 – at stayed sea.

 Mina
 2003 – affected Taiwan and China in 2003.
 2007 – Struck the Philippines, killed 71, damages from the storm amounted to US$20 million.
 2011 – hit the Philippines killing 26, and causing widespread damage worth US$26million; later made landfall on Taiwan and on Fujian, China.

 Mindulle
 2004 – struck the Philippines, Taiwan and China.
 2010 – a strong tropical storm made landfall in Vietnam.
 2016 - affected much of Japan during August 2016.
 2021 - reached category 5 super typhoon status and affected eastern Japan.

 Mindy
 2003 – remained at sea, but caused minor damage in Puerto Rico.
 2021 – made landfall in Florida, weakening to a tropical depression shortly after. Also triggered deadly flooding in Mexico, killing 23 people.

 Miriam
 1978 – a Category 1 hurricane that threatened Hawaii but did not affect land.
 1982 – a Category 1 hurricane that did not affect land.
 1988 – continuation of Hurricane Joan which originally formed in the Atlantic Ocean and crossed into the Pacific.
 1994 – a short-lived storm that did not affect land.
 2000 – a short-lived storm that hit Baja California as a weak storm.
 2006 – a short-lived tropical storm that did not affect land.
 2012 – a Category 3 hurricane that did not affect land.
 2018 – a Category 2 hurricane that did not affect land.

 Mirinae
 2009 – made landfall on Luzon, Philippines, and later Southern Vietnam.
 2016 – made landfall on Hainan, China, and later on Northern Vietnam.
 2021 – remained out to sea.

 Mitag
 2002 - A powerful Category 5 storm in March 2002, but did not affect land.
 2007 – Struck the Philippines, killed 71, damages from the storm amounted to $19.79 million.
 2014 – recognised as a subtropical storm by the Joint Typhoon Warning Center.
 2019 – a moderately strong tropical cyclone that severely affected Taiwan, East China and South Korea in early October 2019.

 Mitch (1998) – a catastrophic Category 5 hurricane during the 1998 Atlantic hurricane season that caused more than 11,000 fatalities in Central America.
 Molave
 2009 – a category 1 typhoon made landfall in China killed at least four people.
 2015 – did not make landfall.
 2020 - a powerful typhoon that devastated the Southern Luzon area of the Philippines and Vietnam.

 Mona
 1963 – a Category 1 hurricane that made landfall in western Mexico. 
 2000 – a severe tropical cyclone that caused moderate damage in Tonga. 
 2019 – a moderate tropical cyclone that had minimal impact on land.

 Monica
 1967 – which spent its life at sea south of Mexico.
 1971 – did not affect land.
 1975 – stayed far from land
 1984 – formed west of New Caledonia, dissipated in the Coral Sea.
 2006 –  A 2006 cyclone and was the most intense tropical cyclone, in terms of maximum sustained winds, on record to impact Australia, tied with Cyclone Marcus in 2018.

 Morakot
 2003 – brought significant rainfall to Taiwan before alleviating drought conditions in mainland China in August 2003.
 2009 – the deadliest typhoon to impact Taiwan in recorded history.

 Muifa
 2004 – struck the Philippines and Vietnam.
 2011 – approached Japan, China and Korea.
 2017 – did not make landfall.
 2022 – the most powerful typhoon to hit Shanghai since Typhoon Gloria in 1949.

 Mujigae
 2009 – made landfall on Hainan Island and then on Vietnam.
 2015 – a destructive Category 4 typhoon that formed just east of the Philippines and made landfall in Guangdong, China.

 Mulan (2022) – a weak tropical storm affected South China and Vietnam.
 Mun (2019) – a weak tropical storm that nearly crossed the Gulf of Tonkin to the coast of Vietnam and made landfall in Northern Vietnam—killed 2 people.

See also

Tropical cyclone
Tropical cyclone naming
European windstorm names
Atlantic hurricane season
List of Pacific hurricane seasons
South Atlantic tropical cyclone

References

General

 
 
 
 
 
 
 
 
 
 
 
 
 
 
 
 
 

 
 
 
 
 

M